"Silver & Gold'" is a single released by Ghanaian British musician Sway from his second studio album The Signature LP. It features vocals from Akon. The single was released on 15 February 2009; it peaked at number 61 on the UK Singles Chart.

Track listing
UK Digital download
 "Silver & Gold" - 4:12
 "Silver & Gold" (Mr Katsav Club Remix) - 6:16
 "Silver & Gold" (Future Freakz Club Mix) - 6:47
 "Silver & Gold" (Radio Edit) - 3:24
 "Silver & Gold" (Mr Katsav Radio Edit) - 3:18
 "Silver & Gold" (Future Freakz Radio Edit) - 3:31
 "Silver & Gold" (Future Freakz Dub Mix) - 6:45
 "Silver & Gold" (Instrumental) - 4:11
 "Silver & Gold" (Music video) - 4:10

Chart performance

Release history

References

2008 songs
2009 singles
Akon songs
Sway (musician) songs
Song articles with missing songwriters